A coalition is a pact or treaty among individuals or groups, during which they cooperate in joint action, each in their own self-interest, joining forces together for a common cause.

Coalition may also refer to:

Politics
Coalition government, a form of government in which political parties cooperate to form a government
Coalition (Australia), a group of centre-right parties, consisting primarily of the Liberal Party of Australia and the National Party of Australia
Coalition (Chile), a coalition in Chile formed in 1891 after the Chilean Civil War
Coalition (Colombia), a conservative political party in Colombia
Coalition (Netherlands), a historic coalition between three confessional parties of the Netherlands
Coalition (Puerto Rico), a defunct electoral alliance in Puerto Rico
Coalition of the willing, a political phrase used to collectively describe participants in military interventions for which the United Nations Security Council cannot agree to mount a full UN peacekeeping operation

Fiction
Coalition (Star Fleet Universe), a group in the Star Fleet Universe

Other uses
 Coalescence (physics), the permanent joining together of two or more bodies
 Coalition, a group of male lions
 Coalition (album), a 1970 album by American jazz drummer Elvin Jones
 Coalition (film), a 2015 British television film 
 "Coalition" (Justified), a 2012 episode of the TV series Justified
 Coalition Wars, a series of European conflicts in the late 18th and early 19th centuries
 The Coalition (company), a video game developer
 The Coalition For Women In Journalism, also known as The Coalition

See also

 
 
 
 Coalition of the willing (disambiguation)
 Alliance (disambiguation)